Originally created by Herb Rose, Falken BBS was one of the few BBS products which allowed up to 128 users to dial into a single system (running DOS) using multiport hardware, requiring no external multitasker. The product was far advanced from the large number of other BBS systems available at the time allowing users to interact in online teleconferences and multiplayer games.

Dates back to at least 1989.

Herb's company Info*share struggled to market this product against the already well established Major BBS product developed by Galacticomm. The product enjoyed moderate success but eventually Herb relented and sold the product in 1996 to Chris Whitacre of California who continued to develop the product on the Linux platform, finally discontinuing the original DOS based product.

Ironically, in 2002, Falken was again sold to Michael Polzin of WilderLand Software, one of the companies which actively supported the competitive Major BBS product as an independent software vendor.

The name Falken was a cultural reference to the hacker movie WarGames.

References 
BBS Documentary Listing of BBS's including Falken

External links
WilderLand Software Falken BBS Web Site
Chris Whitacre archived Falken BBS Web Site
The BBS Archives Falken BBS Software

Bulletin board systems